Cranbrook School is a dual-campus independent Anglican early learning, primary and secondary day and boarding school for boys, located in Bellevue Hill and Rose Bay, both eastern suburbs of Sydney, New South Wales, Australia. It was founded in 1918 with the Rev'd Frederick Thomas Perkins as the first headmaster. Cranbrook has a non-selective enrolment policy and currently caters for approximately 1,680 students from early learning (4 years old) to Year 12 (18 years old), including 97 boarders from Years 7 to 12. Cranbrook is affiliated with the International Boys' Schools Coalition (IBSC), the Association of Heads of Independent Schools of Australia (AHISA), the Junior School Heads Association of Australia (JSHAA), the Australian Boarding Schools' Association (ABSA), and the Headmasters' and Headmistresses' Conference. It is a founding member of the Combined Associated Schools (CAS).

History 
On 1 December 1917 the former private home and vice-regal residence, Cranbrook, was bought at auction by an agent for Samuel Hordern. He was the main financial benefactor of a group of businessmen and churchmen aiming to establish an Anglican boys' school in the Eastern Suburbs. From December 1917 to June 1918, a provisional committee of twelve, comprising the founders and six additional men, prepared for the opening of the new school. They held meetings, ensured building renovations were completed, drew up the first articles of association and appointed the first Headmaster, Rev. F. T. Perkins. On 6 June 1918, the provisional committee reformed itself as the first council of Cranbrook School and organised the official opening of the school for 22 July 1918.

Headmasters

Campus 
Cranbrook school is situated over four campuses; the Senior School (Years 7 to 12) are located on the main campus in suburban Bellevue Hill, while the Junior School, for students from Kindergarten to Year 6, is located in nearby Rose Bay.

House system 
Cranbrook has a system of houses from year seven to twelve. This system was created in order for boys to socialise better between different year groups, where senior boys would be acting as juniors' mentors within the house. There are currently 14 day-houses, with about 80 boys each. There are also two boarding houses with around 40 boys each.

Day houses 
The school has 12 houses for day students:

Boarding houses
Cranbrook has two houses for boarding students:

Sport 
Cranbrook School is a member of the Combined Associated Schools (CAS).

CAS premierships 
Cranbrook School has won the following CAS premierships.

 Athletics (7) - 1930, 1934, 1936, 1943, 1951, 1952, 1965
 Basketball - 2007
 Cricket (6) - 1935, 1989, 1998, 2020, 2021, 2022, 2023
 Cross Country (8) - 2009, 2010, 2011, 2012, 2013, 2016, 2017, 2022
 Rugby (13) - 1930, 1931, 1933, 1943, 1960, 1969, 1972, 1973, 1982, 1984, 1985, 1994, 2014
 Swimming (8) - 1942, 1944, 1945, 1949, 1950, 1955, 1974, 1976

Notable alumni 

Alumni of Cranbrook School are known as "Old Cranbrookians" and may elect to join the school's alumni association, the Old Cranbrookians' Association (OCA). For a list of notable Old Cranbrookians, see the list of Old Boys of Cranbrook School. These "Old Cranbrookians" include Kerry, Clyde, and James Packer, David Gyngell, Hon.  Tim Bruxner, Olympic sprinter Steven Solomon, Mike Cannon-Brookes, and Murray Rose.

Controversies

Anti-Semitic incidents
In 2022, there were reports that three students were the targets of anti-Semitic behaviour by fellow students.  Later, video footage of a student doing a Nazi salute emerged. In September 2022, the school announced an internal review to look into it. Cranbrook has said it had built an improved and centralised incident behaviour register and strengthened its alliances with organisations including the NSW Jewish Board of Deputies.

Mass resignation from school council
In November 2022, 10 of the 11 members of Cranbrook School’s council announced their resignation due to a deteriorating relationship between headmaster and school council president, as well as disagreement over plans to admit girls to the century-old boys’ school from 2026. The Cranbrook School Council has appointed 13 new Councillors to fill the casual vacancies arising from retirements from Council on 31 December 2022, as previously announced. This follows the 21 November 2022 announcement that all but one member of the Cranbrook School Council intended to resign. Subsequently, on 25 November, former School Presidents, Helen Nugent AC and Roger Massy-Greene AM, formed an independent Nominations Committee to make recommendations to the current Council on nominations for new members of Council.

See also 

 List of non-government schools in New South Wales
 List of Anglican schools in New South Wales
 List of boarding schools in Australia
 Lawrence Campbell Oratory Competition
 Leura

References

Further reading
 "Two magic words give the signal for a 'school in a park, 20 June 2006, The Sydney Morning Herald (now archived).

External links

 

Boarding schools in New South Wales
Anglican primary schools in Sydney
Anglican secondary schools in Sydney
Educational institutions established in 1918
Member schools of the Headmasters' and Headmistresses' Conference
Combined Associated Schools
Boys' schools in New South Wales
Junior School Heads Association of Australia Member Schools
1918 establishments in Australia
Rose Bay, New South Wales
John Horbury Hunt buildings
Bellevue Hill, New South Wales